21st Century Newspapers was a corporation owning newspapers in the state of Michigan and based in Pontiac, Michigan, and founded in 1995.

History
21st Century Newspapers' first acquisitions were The Oakland Press and The Macomb Daily and The Royal Oak Tribune on August 21, 1997. They were purchased from The Walt Disney Company in Burbank, California.  21st Century under Frank Shepherd, president, chairman, and CEO, began a buying spree that eventually ended with approx. 129 newspaper titles. The company also acquired newspaper assets of Brill Media Company(purchased out of bankruptcy) in August 2002 including Morning Sun daily newspaper in Mt. Pleasant, Michigan, and newspapers in Traverse City, Charlevoix, Gaylord, East Jordan, Elk Rapids, Central Lake, Bellaire and Tawas City and other communities in central and northern Michigan. In addition newspapers in "Downriver Detroit" were also purchased including newspapers in Wyandotte, Southgate, Dearborn, Lincoln Park, Melvindale, Allen Park, Taylor and Trenton  In September 2002, Booth Newspapers acquired 21st Century Newspapers Suburban Flint Newspaper Group which has nine local papers: The Clio Messenger, The Davison Flagstaff, The Fenton Press, The Grand Blanc News, Flint Township News, The Flushing Observer, The Holly Press, The Suburban Burton, and Swartz Creek News and included Suburban Flint shopper.  All of which became part of the Flint Journal as the Community Newspapers. on August 21st, 2005, 21st Century was acquired by Journal Register Company.

Assets
Oakland Press
The Macomb Daily
Daily Tribune, Royal Oak
Morning Sun, Mount Pleasant 
and approx. 120 other newspaper titles. In addition, the acquiring company purchased The Greater Detroit Newspaper Network. This 21st Century Company operated as the major group selling arm of 21st Century Newspapers. They generated approx. $25. million of annual profit by selling to national companies with most revenue coming from pre-printed inserts. The sale of 21st Century Newspapers in August 2005 was the largest newspaper sales by dollar volume in the US for the year 2005. Shepherd remained a consultant for the purchasing company for a short period then left and joined other newspaper companies Board of Directors. In 2012 he finally retired to Charlevoix, Michigan where he still resides. He started a township newspaper in 2018 and it still is published monthly and has a website. Shepherd began his newspaper career in Port Huron, Michigan as a carrier boy for The Port Huron Times Herald owned by the "Weil Family". He rose to become Classified Manager then the company purchased a weekly, Utica Sentinel, in Utica, Michigan. Shepherd became General Manager and turned the weekly into a daily newspaper, The Daily Sentinel. It was sold to Gannett in the late 1960's. Shepherd previously worked for Scripps Howard Newspapers in Cincinnati, Ohio as VP of Operations from 1983 until 1991. He was recruited by Stauffer Communications in 1991 as President and CEO and a member of The Board of Directors. Previously, Shepherd also worked for Panax Corporation of East Lansing, Michigan, and was a member of their Board of Directors. He joined the company in 1968 and headed the sale of the company, in part to Rupert Murdock(Texas newspapers) in August 1980. Shepherd then moved to Houston, Texas where he founded the book publishing company, Pioneer Publishing Company. He sold that company to his partner and took a consulting job with a California publishing company headed by Charles Morris of Morris Publishing in Savannah, Georgia. After the consulting agreement Shepherd joined Scripps Howard in Cincinnati as VP of Newspaper Operations where he stayed from 1982 until 1992. His career spanned the 50's through the 2000s. From hot-metal days until offset and heatset printing. He mastered all 3 processes but empire-building; buying, building, and selling was his forte. His last venture was 21st Century Newspapers, Inc. which employed over 2,000 employees. He was considered an early pioneer in suburban journalism and a leader in "clustering" suburban newspapers into shared printing, sales, and accounting services. He studied rotogravure printing with Axel-Springer in Hamburg, Germany, and build printing plants in South Africa at the behest of the South African Gov't.    

Shepherd sold 21st Century, in August 2005 for $415,000,000 cash then retired to Charlevoix, Michigan. He is married to the former Beth Louise Lyons(Shepherd) for the past 41 years. In total, his newspaper career spanned 5 decades from the early 1960's until 2005.

Notes

Newspapers published in Michigan
Defunct newspaper companies of the United States
Publishing companies established in 1995
Companies based in Oakland County, Michigan
1995 establishments in Michigan
2004 disestablishments in Michigan